Aarathi Edungadi is a 1990 Indian Tamil-language film directed by Chandranath and produced by H.Murali. It stars Rahman and Khushbu. The film was released on 28 July 1990.

Plot 

Meera is treated like a servant and tortured by her stepmother, Shakunthula. Her only friend is the family maid, Annamma. Shakunthala and her brother Narajan want to keep Meera under their control as all the wealth is in her name. They plot to marry her off to an easily controllable man to ensure their wealthy lifestyles aren't impacted. Kannan enters the home while running away from the police. He is a prisoner on death row. Shakuntala arranges for Meera to marry Kannan as she would always have the threat of the police to control him. It is only after the marriage she realizes that Kannan isn't who he claimed to be and the entire family is thrown into turmoil. Police officer Shankara is also pulled into the proceedings as he begins to investigate the years old death of Meera's father. Meera navigates through all the confusion in search of a happy life.

Cast 
Rahman as Kannan
Khushbu as Meera
Vivek as Vivek
Lalitha Kumari as Lali
Jaishankar as Shankara
Janagaraj as Kaaliyapatti Ramasamy
Manorama as Annamma
Sangeeta as Shakunthala
Santhana Bharathi as Natarajan
Sulakshana
Kula Deivam V. R. Rajagopal
Vijay Babu
V. K. Ramasamy as VKR

Soundtrack 
Soundtrack was composed by Shankar–Ganesh.

Reception 
The Indian Express wrote, "There can be nothing more heartwarming for naive film audience than seeing the underdog triumphing and this is Chandranath's trump card".

References

External links 
 

1990 films
1990s Tamil-language films
Films scored by Shankar–Ganesh